Honiton railway station serves the town of Honiton in east Devon, England.

History
The station was designed by William Tite with the main building on the westbound platform, even though this is the side furthest from the town centre. The station was on an embankment on the west side of New Street and the goods yard with a small goods shed was on the south side beyond the station building. Further sidings were provided on the north side of the line opposite the main goods yard. Goods facilities were withdrawn on 8 May 1967.

In August 2009, a new footbridge was erected at Honiton Railway Station replacing an older footbridge. The location of the footbridge moved towards the Exeter end of the station.

It was announced in early December 2010 that Honiton Railway Station was to undergo a phase of several improvements. This phase of £1.4 million improvements set out to provide the station with a brighter enlarged booking hall, new toilets and changing facilities; and also a retail unit. In addition, both platforms were fitted with accessible ramps along with a new waiting shelter to make it easier for all passengers to use the 
station.

The project, funded by South West Trains, Devon County Council, Network Rail and the National Station Improvement Programme has made the station more accessible. As part of South West Trains' commitment to deliver greener travel, the station was also equipped with shelters, additional CCTV and 1000 new bicycle spaces.

Work on the improvement scheme started in early December 2010 and the completed refurbishment was officially unveiled on Thursday 23 June 2011. To mark the completion, Andy Pitt, managing director for South West Trains along with councillor Stuart Hughes from Devon County Council gathered at the station for a photo and unveiling.

Stationmasters

James McLees 1863 - 1894 (formerly station master at Axminster)
W.H. Smith 1894 - 1912
William Thomas Smith 1912 - 1920 (formerly station master at Seaton Junction)
F. Perry 1920 - 1927
William George Dymott Kail 1927 - 1937 (formerly station master at South Moulton)
S. Towler 1937 - 1946 (afterwards station master at Amesbury)
W.T. Piper 1946 - 1950 (formerly station master at Budleigh Salterton)

Roundball Halt 
There was, for a few years, a second station in Honiton. It was opened in September 1906 about half a mile from the town station to allow soldiers to reach a rifle range at Roundball Hill, south west of the town centre. It was never advertised in timetables and was demolished early in 1921.

Accidents and incidents 
On Sunday 4 October 2009 at 11.45pm, a man escaped injuries after he walked onto the railway line at Honiton Railway Station. Police stated that a train managed to stop without hitting the man. Shortly afterwards, the 33-year-old man was sent to hospital to take a mental health assessment.

Facilities
A modern station building stands on the main platform which is on the southern side of the line. A footbridge to the west of this links the northern platform which has a small waiting shelter. The signal box is at the Exeter end of this platform and the main station car park is situated behind this, however the 1957 signal box closed and was knocked down in late spring of 2012. The station saw a refurbishment in Spring 2011, providing a new booking hall, more CCTV, shelters and increased accessibility.

Services

Off-peak, all services at Honiton are operated by South Western Railway using  and  DMUs.

The typical off-peak service in trains per hour is:
 1 tph to  via 
 1 tph to 

Signalling

A signal box was built in 1875 at the Exeter end of the station on the south side of the line. This was replaced by a new building on 16 June 1957 which was on the opposite side of the tracks. The westbound platform was signalled to allow eastbound trains to use it when they are not crossing a train coming in the opposite direction. In December 2009 a new loop was installed at Axminster to break up the section towards Chard. One siding was retained to the west of the signal box, worked by a ground frame rather than from the signal box itself, however this has now also been lifted.

Another signal box was provided at Honiton Incline. This was situated on the north side of the line beyond the  Honiton Tunnel. The line climbs from  towards Honiton at 1 in 100 (1%) and then continues up to the tunnel mouth a slightly steeper gradients, it then drops at 1 in 80 (1.25%) down to the former .

In 2012 signalling for the Salisbury-Exeter line transferred to the new signalling centre at Basingstoke. Signals previously controlled by Gillingham, Templecombe, Yeovil Junction and Honiton boxes all now have the prefix SE.

See also
 Southern Railway routes west of Salisbury

References

External links

Railway stations in Devon
Former London and South Western Railway stations
Railway stations in Great Britain opened in 1860
Railway stations served by South Western Railway
Honiton
Railway stations served by Great Western Railway
DfT Category D stations